The Nth Commandment is a 1923 American silent drama film directed by Frank Borzage and starring Colleen Moore. It is based on a story, The Nth Commandment, by Fannie Hurst, a well-known novelist of the day.

The film's title jests somewhat Cecil B. DeMille's upcoming epic The Ten Commandments (1923) which was released later that same year.

Cast
Colleen Moore as Sarah Juke
James W. Morrison as Harry Smith
Eddie Phillips as Jimmie Fitzgibbons
Charlotte Merriam as Angine Sprunt
George Cooper as Max Plute
Mary Marguerite as Little Girl (uncredited)

Preservation
An incomplete copy of The Nth Commandment is in the Library of Congress collection.

References

External links

Lantern slide

1923 films
American silent feature films
Films directed by Frank Borzage
Films based on short fiction
Paramount Pictures films
1923 drama films
Silent American drama films
American black-and-white films
Films with screenplays by Frances Marion
Films based on works by Fannie Hurst
1920s American films